Rosenhof High School is a special education school for girls age 13 and over in Bloemfontein, South Africa.

Rosenhof is  governed by the Free State Education and Social Development Department and falls under the Inclusive Education sector.  The school caters to girls with behavioural, emotional and social problems.

Rosenhof operates as a LSEN (Learners with Special Educational Needs) school with  full boarding, psychologists and social workers in addition to the teaching staff.

Girls' schools in South Africa
Schools in the Free State (province)